Fifa may refer to:
 FIFA, the world governing body for association football (soccer)
 FIFA (video game series), EA Sports association football video games
 Ilias Fifa (born 1989), Moroccan-born Spanish long-distance runner
 Fifa Riccobono, Australian music industry executive
 Fifa Mountains, Jazan Province, Saudi Arabia
 Fifa Nature Reserve, Jordan
 fi. fa., abbreviation of fieri facias, a type of legal writ